The 1984–85 season was PAOK Football Club's 59th in club's history and 26th consecutive in the top flight of Greek football. The team entered the Greek Football Cup in first round.

Players

Squad

Transfers

Players transferred in

Players transferred out

Kit

Pre-season

Competitions

Overview

Alpha Ethniki

Standings

Results summary

Results by round

Matches

Greek Cup

First round

Second round

Third round

Quarter-finals

Semi-finals

Final

Statistics

Squad statistics

! colspan="13" style="background:#DCDCDC; text-align:center" | Goalkeepers
|-

! colspan="13" style="background:#DCDCDC; text-align:center" | Defenders
|-

	

! colspan="13" style="background:#DCDCDC; text-align:center" | Midfielders
|-

! colspan="13" style="background:#DCDCDC; text-align:center" | Forwards
|-

	

|}

Source: Match reports in rsssf.com

Goalscorers

Source: Match reports in rsssf.com

External links
 www.rsssf.com
 PAOK FC official website

References 

PAOK FC seasons
PAOK
Greek football championship-winning seasons